Enemy of the state is a political / criminal term.

Enemy of the State may also refer to:

Enemy of the State (film), a 1998 spy-thriller film directed by Tony Scott
Enemy of the State (album), a 2000 album by C-Bo
Enemy of the State: A Love Story, a mixtape by Lupe Fiasco
"Enemy of the State" (Homeland), a television episode
An Enemy of the State, a 1965 British television series

See also
 Enema of the State, a 1999 studio album by Blink-182
 Enemy of the people (disambiguation)
 Public enemy (disambiguation)